Seyyed Amer (also Romanized as Seyyed ‘Āmer; also known as Jorgeh Sed ‘Amer, Jorgeh-ye Seyyed ‘Āmer-e Ţāleqānī, and Seyyed ‘Āmer-e Ţāleqānī) is a village in Allah-o Akbar Rural District, in the Central District of Dasht-e Azadegan County, Khuzestan Province, Iran. At the 2006 census, its population was 234, in 41 families.

References 

Populated places in Dasht-e Azadegan County